Mirabilia Urbis Romae ("Marvels of the City of Rome") is a much-copied medieval Latin text that served generations of pilgrims and tourists as a guide to the city of Rome. The original, which was written by a canon of St Peter's, dates from the 1140s. The text survives in numerous manuscripts.

"Unhampered by any very accurate knowledge of the historical continuity of the city, the unknown author has described the monuments of Rome, displaying a considerable amount of inventive faculty," the Catholic Encyclopedia reports. The legend-filled Mirabilia remained the standard guide to the city until the fifteenth century. At the time it was written, the inhabited part of Rome, the abitato, was a small city located in the bend of the Tiber River surrounded by the ruins of the great ancient city, where within the standing walls and gates of the ancient city were fields where cattle sheep and goats grazed among the temples and baths, giving to the Roman Forum its name Campo Vaccino (the "cow pasture").

From the pontificate of Boniface VIII (1294–1303) to that of John XXII (1316–34) the text was revised and enlarged. Its authority was unquestioned until the 15th century, when two authors set out to supersede it with new descriptions from a fresh Renaissance point of view. One was Leon Battista Alberti's Descriptio urbis Romae, written ca.1433. Another was Flavio Biondo's Roma instaurata, written in 1444 and circulated in manuscript; it was printed in 1481.

Modern critical attention was first drawn to the different versions of Mirabilia Urbis Romae by the 19th-century archaeologist of Christian Rome,  Giovanni Battista de Rossi, in  Roma Sotterranea (vol I, 1864, pp 158ff).  The edition  of Louis Duchesne in the Liber Censuum de l'Eglise Romaine (I, Paris, 1905, 262-73), gave the text of the original of Cencius Camerarius with the variants of four other manuscripts. In 1889, Francis Morgan Nichols published the first English translation, which was reprinted in 1986 by Italica Press.

Contents
The contents of the Mirabilia fall into the following sections, the title headings being taken from the "Liber Censuum":
 De muro urbis (concerning the wall of the city);
 De portis urbis (the gates of the city);
 De miliaribus (the milestones);
 Nomina portarum (the names of the gates);
 Quot porte sunt Transtiberim (how many gates are beyond the Tiber);
 De arcubus (the arches);
 De montibus (the hills);
 De termis (the baths);
 De palatiis (the palaces);
 De theatris (the theatres);
 De locis qui inveniuntur in sanctorum passionibus (the places mentioned in the "passions" of the saints);
 De pontibus (the bridges);
 De cimiteriis (the cemeteries);
 De iussione Octaviani imperatoris et responsione Sibille (the Emperor Octavian's question and the Sibyl's response);
 Quare facti sunt caballi marmorei (why the marble horses were made);
 De nominibus iudicum et eorum instructionibus (the names of the judges and their instructions);
 De columna Antonii et Trajani (the column of Antony and Trajan);
 Quare factus sit equus qui dicitur Constantinus (why the horse was made, which is called of Constantine);
 Quare factum sit Pantheon et postmodum oratio B. (why the Pantheon was built and later oration B.);
 Quare Octavianus vocatus sit Augustus et quare dicatur ecclesia Sancti Petri ad vincula (Why Octavianus was called Augustus, and why the church of St. Peter ad Vincula was so called);
 De vaticano et Agulio (of the Vatican and the Needle);
 Quot sunt templa trans Tiberim (how many temples are beyond the Tiber);
 Predicatio sanctorum (the preaching of the saints).

See also

References
 Catholic Encyclopedia 1908: "Mirabilia Urbis Romae"
 Mirabilia Urbis Romae: from Cesare D´Onofrio, Visitiamo Roma mille anni fa. La città dei Mirabilia (Rome 1988; in Latin)
 Alison Fleming: "Bibliography: Guidebooks to Rome"

Notes

Tourist attractions in Rome
Medieval Rome
Medieval Latin literature